Hopa River is the main water stream of Hopa in the eastern Black Sea Region of Turkey. Hopa River basin is rich in terms of Alluvial deposits which formed in Pleistocene era.

References 

Rivers of Artvin Province